San Giorgio Albanese is a town and comune in the province of Cosenza in the Calabria region of southern Italy.

It is one of the Arbëreshë towns in southern Italy.

People
Jul Variboba, writer

References

Arbëresh settlements